{{Speciesbox
| status = LC
| status_system = IUCN3.1
| status_ref =
| image =  Ciliata mustela motelle à cinq barbillons juvéniles Wimereux 7 juillet 2016 F Lamiot 02.jpg 
| taxon = Ciliata mustela
| authority = (Linnaeus, 1758)
| synonyms = *Gadus mustela Linnaeus, 1758 
Enchelyopus mustela (Linnaeus, 1758) 
Gaidropsarus mustela (Linnaeus, 1758) 
Motella mustela (Linnaeus, 1758) 
Onos mustela (Linnaeus, 1758) 
Ciliata glauca Couch, 1832 
Couchia glauca (Couch, 1832) 
Couchia minor Thompson, 1839 
Motella argenteola Düben & Koren, 1846 
Molvella borealis Kaup, 1858 
| synonyms_ref = 
}}

The fivebeard rockling (Ciliata mustela'') is a coastal ray-finned fish of the family Lotidae. the lings and rocklings. It is found in the eastern Atlantic Ocean. It is not a fish of any commercial importance.

Description
It has a smooth, scaleless body with unusual and long dorsal,  which is made up of a first ray followed by a line of vibrating rays in a furrow in the back. The front part of the dorsal fin does not have any membrane connecting the rays although the rear dorsal fin is which runs the length of the body, as does the anal fin, is made up of rays connected by membrane. It has five barbels around its mouth, two above either nostril and a single barbel on the lower jaw. It has a rather small mouth with the corners of the mouth just going beyond the eye. The main colour is dark brown. This fades to pale gray-brown on the underside.

Distribution
The fivebeard rockling is found in the eastern Atlantic from Finnmark to Lisbon, including the Skagerrak, the Kattegat, Iceland and around Great Britain and Ireland.

Habitat and biology
The fivebeard rockling is found in the intertidal zone, often under rocks. They are usually found in rocky areas but it can be found in breakwater pools on sandy shores so long as these have a growth of algae. They are predatory fish and the major part of their diet is crustaceans but they will eat polychaetes, gastropods and small fish, they have also been recorded consuming algae. The five-bearded rockling has a temperature range of  Both sexes reach maturity at around one year old. A smaller female may lay as few as 9,000 eggs when spawning, while the largest females may lay as many as 30,000. Spawning takes place in the deeper waters of the Atlantic to the west of Ireland during February to May. The eggs and larvae are pelagic.

Threats
The fivebeard rockling is regarded as being of least concern by the IUCN and is not a commercially important species, in the warmer waters in which it occurs it may be threatened by climate change.

References

fivebeard rockling
Fauna of the British Isles
Fish of Europe
fivebeard rockling
fivebeard rockling